Zidibo San Giacomo  is a town in the Metropolitan City of Milan, Lombardy, northern Italy.

References

Cities and towns in Lombardy